WCAP may refer to:

 WCAP (AM), a radio station (980 AM) licensed to Lowell, Massachusetts
 WCAP (Washington, D.C.), a defunct radio station in Washington, D.C., which was on-air from June 1923 to July 1926
 WADB (AM), a radio station (1310 AM) licensed to Asbury Park, New Jersey, which held the call sign WCAP from 1926 to 1947
 Web Calendar Access Protocol
 World Class Athlete Program, a United States Army unit headquartered at Fort Carson, CO.